Teoponte Municipality is the eighth municipal section of the Larecaja Province in the  La Paz Department, Bolivia. Its seat is Teoponte.

Languages 
The languages spoken in the Teoponte Municipality are mainly Spanish, Aymara and Quechua.

Ref.: obd.descentralizacion.gov.bo

See also 
 Kaka River

References 
 www.ine.gob.bo / census 2001: Teoponte Municipality

External links 
 Old map of Larecaja Province (showing its previous political division)

Municipalities of La Paz Department (Bolivia)